Diana Valencia (born 1978) is a Colombian planetary scientist and astrophysicist. She is an associate professor of Physics and Astrophysics, University of Toronto, Scarborough, and of Astronomy & Astrophysics, University of Toronto.

Valencia, with her Ph.D. advisory team of Richard J. O'Connell and Dimitar D. Sasselov at Harvard University, coined the term Super-Earths to describe extra-solar planets (solid) with masses up to ten times Earth’s mass. Valencia’s research characterizes planets with masses between gas giants and Earth’s.

Biography

Diana Valencia immigrated from Colombia to Canada with her parents when she was studying a B.S. in Physics from University of Los Andes, Colombia. Though from a family of engineers, she intended to become a historian or economist in Colombia. Ultimately, she was influenced by her chemical engineer mother, despite her mother's misogynistic experiences in Colombia.  Once in Canada, she realized there were career opportunities for women in the sciences and earned a B.A., then M.S. in Physics at University of Toronto. Valencia was inspired to apply for post-graduate programs and was accepted into Harvard University as a doctoral student. A simple question from a professor provided one of her greatest academic motivations: What would the Earth be like if it were twice its mass? From this point she dedicated herself to extra-solar planet investigations. Valencia's success in her career includes being the mother of two children, a son and a daughter.

Selected academic work

In 2006, Valencia's first major publication, "Internal Structure of Massive Terrestrial Planets", proposed the first mass-radius relationship for rocky exoplanets that associated mass, radius, and internal structure of solid planets more massive than Earth.

2007's publication, "Radius and Structure Models of the First Super-Earth Planet", recognized that exoplanets of different compositions would have different mass and radius measurements as quantified by degeneracy pressures, including exoplanets with iron cores, rocky mantles, and icy/liquid shells.

Recognizing that human interest in the habitability of extra-solar planets drives much of their investigation, and that plate tectonics plays an important role in life on Earth, another 2007 publication, "Inevitability of Plate Tectonics on Super-Earths", was the first published investigation to propose that larger-massed terrestrial planets should experience plate tectonics due to thinner, weaker lithospheres and higher stresses.

In 2013, "Bulk Composition of GJ 1214b and Other Sub-Neptunian Exoplanets", attempts to show an atmospheric exoplanet's composition was attained based on planetary mass and radius, and its evolution and internal characteristics.

2018’s "Habitability from Tidally Induced Tectonics" introduced the mechanism of vertical recycling of carbon through a planet's volcanic activity and sequestered carbon onto, and with, the basaltic oceanic crust settling ("foundering") and re-entering the mantle. This heat-pipe tectonism is equivalent to Earth's plate tectonics, enabling carbon-silicate cycling, thereby maintaining Earth habitable for billions of years.

"Can a Machine Learn the Outcome of Planetary Collisions?", published 2019, explores improved methods of predicting the outcome of planetary collisions thought to be important in the last stages of planet formation. This machine learning approach seems a promising avenue. The methodology identifies variables needing further investigation to build better predictive models as large ratio of target to impactor masses and low velocities.

Recognition

 2008 Poincare Postdoctoral Fellowship at Observatoire de la Côte d'Azur, Nice, France
 Alumna of the Origins of Life Institute, department of Earth and Planetary Sciences, Harvard University
 2010 Sagan NASA Postdoctoral Fellow
 2021 International Paolo Farinella Prize, awarded by the European Planetary Society for her significant contributions in our understanding of the interior structure and dynamics of terrestrial and super-Earth exoplanets. This prize was shared with Lena Noack.

References

20th-century Colombian women scientists
Women astrophysicists
Harvard Graduate School of Arts and Sciences alumni
Academic staff of the University of Toronto Scarborough
University of Los Andes (Colombia) alumni
University of Toronto alumni
Canadian people of Colombian descent
1978 births
Living people